Thallarcha polystigma is a moth in the subfamily Arctiinae. It was described by Turner in 1943. It is found in Australia, where it has been recorded from Queensland.

References

]

Moths described in 1943
Lithosiini